The Aïna River is a tributary of the Ivindo River that rises in Cameroon. Along the way it forms the border between Cameroon and Gabon and then the border between Gabon and Republic of the Congo (Map.).

The native pygmies along the river were noted as some of the few to use the plant Strophanthus tholonii as an ingredient in their arrow poison; other Strophanthus species are more commonly used.

See also
Communes of Cameroon

References

Rivers of Gabon
Rivers of Cameroon
Rivers of the Republic of the Congo
Republic of the Congo–Gabon border
Cameroon–Gabon border
International rivers of Africa
South Region (Cameroon)
Border rivers